Henry Hunt may refer to:

Henry Jackson Hunt (Mayor of Detroit) (died 1826), mayor of Detroit, Michigan
Henry Hunt (cricketer) (born 1997), Australian cricketer
Henry Hunt (politician) (1773–1835), British politician
Henry Jackson Hunt (1819–1889), American Civil War general
Henry Clinton Hunt (1840–1908), American politician
Henry Ambrose Hunt (1866–1946), British meteorologist
Henry Thomas Hunt (1878–1956), mayor of Cincinnati, Ohio, 1912–1913
Henry Hunt (police officer) (1918–2008), British police officer
Henry Hunt (artist) (1923–1985), Canadian Kwakwaka'wakw artist
Henry A. Hunt (1866–1938), African-American educator

See also
William Henry Hunt (disambiguation)